Planet Mechanics is a British TV program shown on the National Geographic Channel in 2008. The show has ended after the first series.

Background
Planet Mechanics sees two engineers, Dick Strawbridge and Jem Stansfield, travelling in an eco-friendly workshop, previously a horse trailer, to fix the planet's most pressing environmental problems.

Episodes

External links
 
 Planet Mechanics Website At National Geographic UK
 Planet Mechanics Website At National Geographic AU

2008 British television series debuts
2008 British television series endings
British television documentaries
National Geographic (American TV channel) original programming
British television miniseries
English-language television shows